Bucur is a Romanian surname. Notable people with the surname include:

Alina Bucur, Romanian-born American mathematician
Dragoș Bucur (born 1977), Romanian actor
Florica Bucur (born 1959), Romanian rower
Gheorghe Bucur (born 1980), Romanian football player
Maria Bucur (born 1968), Romanian historian
Olimpiu Bucur (born 1989), Romanian footballer

Romanian-language surnames